Nullawarre is a locality in south west Victoria, Australia.

References

External links

Towns in Victoria (Australia)